She Paid The Ultimate Price (ukr: Вона заплатила життям) is a 2011 documentary produced, directed and co-written by Iryna Korpan, a Ukrainian-Canadian television personality. The film
is based on the life of her own grandmother, Kateryna Sikorska, who was executed by hanging by the Nazis in 1943 for hiding a Jewish family in her cellar.

Kateryna Sikorska was eventually awarded the title of "Righteous among the Nations".

The film's soundtrack incorporates music by Maksym Berezovsky, Levko Revutsky, Myroslav Skoryk, Victor Mishalow, Roman Turovsky and Michael Alpert.

References

External links

The complete film on IMDb

2011 films
Canadian documentary films
Ukrainian documentary films
Documentary films about the Holocaust
2011 documentary films
Documentary films about women in World War II
Ukrainian Righteous Among the Nations
Documentary films about Ukraine
2010s Canadian films